The Taipei Economic and Cultural Representative Office in the United States represents the interests of Taiwan in the United States in the absence of formal diplomatic relations, functioning as a de facto embassy. Its counterpart in Taiwan is the office of the American Institute in Taiwan (AIT) in Taipei.

History
Prior to 1979, the Republic of China (Taiwan) was represented in Washington by its embassy, occupying the building now used by Haiti.  After the transfer of recognition of  China to the People's Republic of China, the Republic of China was no longer recognized by the United States, and therefore no longer entitled to use the former embassy, with its diplomatic mission replaced by the current Taipei Economic and Cultural Representative Office. The mission serves as the office of the Coordination Council for North American Affairs (CCNAA) in Washington DC, established in 1979 as the counterpart to AIT, after the United States established diplomatic relations with the People's Republic of China. The council was renamed Taiwan Council for US Affairs in 2019.

In 1994, as a result of the Clinton Administration's Taiwan Policy Review, the name of the CCNAA office in Washington, D.C. (which functioned as an embassy) was changed to Taipei Economic and Cultural Representative Office (TECRO). Similarly, the names of the twelve other CCNAA offices (which functioned as consulates) were changed to Taipei Economic and Cultural Office (TECO).

In September 2020, the US Ambassador to the United Nations Kelly Craft met with James K.J. Lee, director-general of the Taipei Economic and Cultural Office in New York, who was secretary-general in Taiwan’s Ministry of Foreign Affairs until July, for lunch in New York City in what was the first meeting between a top Taiwan official and a United States ambassador to the United Nations. Craft said she and Lee discussed ways the US can help Taiwan become more engaged within the U.N.

Representatives

CCNAA representatives
 James Shen (1 January 1979 – 9 May 1979)
 Konsin Shah, 1979–81
 Cai Weipin, 1981–82
 Fredrick Chien (19 November 1982 – 20 July 1988)
 Ting Mao-shih, 1988–94

TECRO representatives
 Benjamin Lu, 1994–96
 Jason Hu, 1996–97
 Stephen S. F. Chen (1997–2000)
 Chen Chien-jen (30 June 2000 – 20 May 2004)
 David Lee (25 July 2004 – 10 April 2007)
 Joseph Wu (10 April 2007 – 26 July 2008)
 Jason Yuan (4 August 2008 – 27 September 2012)
 King Pu-tsung (27 September 2012 – 24 March 2014)
 Shen Lyu-shun (1 April 2014 – 5 June 2016)
 Stanley Kao (5 June 2016 – 24 July 2020)
 Hsiao Bi-khim (24 July 2020 – present)

US representation
Including:
 Law firm Alston & Bird with former Senator Bob Dole as registered lobbyist, with a $25,000 monthly retainer; two decades of representation by Dole as of 2016.
 Richard A. Gephardt, former Congressman, a $25,000-a-month contract; 2016.
 Thomas A. Daschle, former Senator, a $25,000-a-month contract; since 2015.

See also
 Diplomatic missions in the United States
 Taipei Economic and Cultural Representative Office
 Taipei Economic and Cultural Office in Houston

References

External links

 Taipei Economic and Cultural Representative Office in the United States
 

 

United States
Diplomatic missions in Washington, D.C.
Taiwan–United States relations